Turbo lajonkairii, common name the Lajonkairi's turban, is a species of sea snail, a marine gastropod mollusk in the family Turbinidae, the turban snails.

Description
The length of the shell varies between 50 mm and 100 mm. The large, solid, umbilicate shell has a turbinate shape. Its color pattern is white, sometimes sparsely maculate with chestnut. The six whorls are striate, spirally lirate, and bicarinate. The body whorl is one and one-half armed with erect long stout tubular spines on the carinae, ten to twelve in number on the last whorl, usually tinged with green. The ovate aperture ovate, pearly white and iridescent within. The columella is thickened below, deflexed, produced and somewhat channelled, excavated at the conspicuous umbilicus.

The operculum is subcircular. Inside it is dark brown, with four whorls and a subcentral nucleus. Its outer surface is convex, coarsely granose, and dark brown in the center, lighter and minutely granulate toward the edges. The margin is substriate, with an orange line.

Distribution
This species occurs in the Eastern Indian Ocean (Cocos (Keeling) Islands) and in the Western Pacific

References

 Abbott, R.T. 1950. The Molluscan Fauna of the Cocos-Keeling Islands, Indian Ocean. Bulletin of the Raffles Museum 22: 68-98 
 Maes, V.O. 1967. The littoral marine mollusks of Cocos-Keeling Islands (Indian Ocean). Proceedings of the Academy of Natural Sciences, Philadelphia 119: 93-217 
 Wilson, B. 1993. Australian Marine Shells. Prosobranch Gastropods. Kallaroo, Western Australia : Odyssey Publishing Vol. 1 408 pp.

External links
 To World Register of Marine Species
 

lajonkairii
Gastropods described in 1839